is a railway station in Meguro, Tokyo, Japan, jointly operated by Tokyu Corporation and Tokyo Metro. Despite its name, the station is not located in Nakameguro, but in the neighboring Kamimeguro district.

Lines
Naka-Meguro Station is served by the following lines:
Tōkyū Tōyoko Line
Tokyo Metro Hibiya Line

Naka-Meguro station serves as the transfer point between the Tōkyū Tōyoko Line and the Tokyo Metro Hibiya Line, connecting Yokohama with the districts of Roppongi, Akihabara, Ginza, and Tsukiji in Tokyo, and beyond. The Tōyoko Line continues towards Yokohama, to the districts of Minato Mirai 21, Chinatown, and Motomachi via the Minato Mirai Line.

Station layout
This station consists of two island platforms serving two tracks. Tokyu and Tokyo Metro share the same station and platforms.

Platforms

History

The station opened on August 28, 1927. It has always been elevated. 
On July 22, 1964, the Hibiya Line arrived here as the terminus of the line from Kasumigaseki. 
Services between Hiyoshi and Kita-Koshigaya (on the Tobu Skytree Line) began on August 29 that year. At the same time, the station became an express stop. 
The Naka-Meguro train disaster occurred on March 8, 2000. 
The station became a limited express and commuter limited express stop on March 19, 2003.
On March 16, 2013, Tokyu Toyoko Line began through services with Tokyo Metro Fukutoshin Line. Consequently, Tokyu Toyoko Line's through service with Tokyo Metro Hibiya Line at this station was discontinued on March 16, 2013. All Hibiya Line trains now terminate at this station.

References

External links

 Tokyu Naka-Meguro Station 
 Tokyo Metro Naka-Meguro Station 
 Tokyo Metro Naka-Meguro Station 

Tokyu Toyoko Line
Tokyo Metro Hibiya Line
Stations of Tokyu Corporation
Stations of Tokyo Metro
Railway stations in Tokyo
Railway stations in Japan opened in 1927